Crane School District may refer to:

Crane Elementary School District (Arizona)
Crane Elementary School District in Crane, Oregon
Crane Independent School District in Crane, Texas